Vejstrup is a small town located on the island of Funen in south-central Denmark, in Svendborg Municipality. It is  located 26 km south of Nyborg and 10 km northeast of Svendborg.

References 

Cities and towns in the Region of Southern Denmark
Svendborg Municipality